Georgi (Gia) Dvali (Georgian: გიორგი (გია) დვალი; born 30 May 1964) is a Georgian theoretical physicist. He is a professor of theoretical physics at the Ludwig Maximilian University of Munich, a director at the Max Planck Institute for Physics in Munich, and holds a Silver Professorship Chair at the New York University. His research interests include String theory, Extra dimensions, Quantum gravity, and the Early universe.  

Dvali is considered to be one of the world's leading experts in the field of particle physics.  Among his many contributions stand his pioneering works on Large extra dimensions and the DGP model of modified gravity. 

In 2008, Dvali was awarded the Alexander von Humboldt Professorship.

Early life and education

Dvali was born on 30 May 1964 in Tbilisi, Georgia. He completed his secondary education at the 55th secondary school of Tbilisi and went on to pursue his undergraduate studies at Tbilisi State University's Faculty of Physics. In 1985, he successfully defended his diploma work under the guidance of Professor Zurab Berezhiani. From 1985 to 1992, Dvali worked at the Elephter Andronikashvili Institute of Physics, earning his Ph.D. in particle physics and cosmology in 1992. He then held postdoctoral positions at the International Center for Theoretical Physics (ICTP) in Trieste, Italy from 1992 to 1993 and at the University of Pisa from 1993 to 1995 under the guidance of Riccardo Barbieri.

Research and career

Dvali is best known for the ADD model, which he proposed together with Nima Arkani-Hamed and Savas Dimopoulos in 1998. It is a scenario inspired by string theory to explain the relative weakness of gravity to other forces, in which the Standard Model fields are confined to a (3+1)-dimensional membrane but gravity can also propagate in additional transverse spatial dimensions that are compact but may be as large as one-tenth of a millimeter. In this framework quantum gravity, string theory, and black holes may be experimentally investigated at the Large Hadron Collider.
Dvali's work also includes the large-distance modification of gravity and its application to the cosmological constant problem. With Gregory Gabadadze and Massimo Porrati he co-pioneered and advanced this direction by proposing a generally covariant model of infrared modification of gravity (the so-called DGP model), and studying many novel and subtle features of this class of models.

Giorgi Dvali was invited to the 25th Solvay Conference in Brussels as one of the world's most eminent physicists to participate in the discussion of "The Theory of the Quantum World".
Dvali is actively engaged in teaching activities. During 1997–1998, he was a professor at ICTP. Currently, he is a professor of theoretical physics at New York University (Center for Cosmology and Particle Physics) and the Ludwig Maximilian University of Munich, as well as the director of the Max Planck Institute for Physics (Munich) and a scientist-collaborator at the CERN Center for Atomic Research in Geneva. He is also a distinguished professor of the Free University of Tbilisi.

Honours and awards
Dvali received New York City's Mayor's Award for Excellence in Science and Technology in 2000.

Dvali is a recipient of the David and Lucile Packard Foundation's Packard Fellowship, the Alfred P. Sloan Foundation fellowship, and the Humboldt Professorship (2008).

In popular culture 
Gia Dvali is a well-known and highly respected figure in the Georgian scientific community. In recent years, he has been a frequent speaker at universities throughout Georgia, where he has shared his expertise and insights with students and faculty. Although the general public may not have a detailed understanding of Dvali's work, he is widely recognized for his contributions to the field of theoretical physics and has received significant attention and admiration from the media and the public.

Personal life
Dvali is married and is a parent to two children, one son, and one daughter.

Political views
Dvali has publicly expressed his opposition to the Georgian government's actions during the Ukraine-Russia war. He has called on the public to take peaceful actions such as protests, to express their desire for Georgia's future to be aligned with Europe, and for the country to be considered as a candidate for EU membership. He has stated that Georgia's historical identity is rooted in Europe and that the country has always upheld Christian values, not only through physical means but also through the principles upheld by its thinkers.

References

External links
 Gia Dvali at New York University
 Gia Dvali at Ludwig-Maximilians-Universität, München
 Video about Gia Dvali
Scientific publications of Giorgi Dvali on INSPIRE-HEP

Video 
 Video on Giorgi Dvali's research (Latest Thinking)

1964 births
People associated with CERN
Living people
Scientists from Tbilisi
Physicists from Georgia (country)
String theorists
New York University faculty
Tbilisi State University alumni
Max Planck Institute directors